Felix Thijssen (24 November 1933 – 26 July 2022) was a Dutch author of crime novels, science fiction novels and books for children. In 1999 he won the "Gouden Strop", prize for the best Dutch crime novel, for "Cleopatra". In 2006 he won the "Diamanten Kogel", Belgian prize for the best crime novel, for "Het diepe water" (Deep water).

He lived in Saint-Germain-de-Calberte, France, where he died at the age of 88.

References

External links 
 Felixthijssen.com Site dedicated to Felix Thijssen (Dutch language)

1933 births
2022 deaths
Dutch children's writers
Dutch male screenwriters
Dutch screenwriters
Dutch science fiction writers
People from Rijswijk